Anna M. Longshore Potts (Longshore; April 16, 1829 – October 24, 1912) was an American physician and medical lecturer of the long nineteenth century. She was one of eight members of the first class to be graduated from the Woman's Medical College of Pennsylvania in Philadelphia. She practiced in Philadelphia for a few years after her graduation, then for five years in Adrian, Michigan. Thereafter, she made a tour of the Pacific coast and elsewhere in the U.S., as well as New Zealand, Australia, and England on the prevention of sickness. She traveled around the world twice and gained an enviable reputation as an author and lecturer. Her lifework was a crusade against ignorance and prejudice. As she said, a "diffusion of physiological knowledge would not only tend to prevent disease, but would also be a potent factor in the preservation of morality". Potts belonged to numerous clubs.

Early life and education
Anna Mary Longshore was born in Attleboro (now Langhorne), in Bucks County, Pennsylvania, April 16, 1829. Her parents were Abram and Rhoda Longshore. Anna's siblings included, brothers, Cary Longshore, Isaac S. Longshore, Thomas Ellwood Longshore, and Dr. Joseph S. Longshore, as well as at least one sister, Elizabeth Longshore Burgess.

At the age of 22, Potts was one of the class of eight Pennsylvania Quaker women graduating from the Woman's Medical College of Pennsylvania, in Philadelphia, in 1852. That college was the first one ever chartered in the U.S. wherein a woman could earn and secure a medical degree. They were received with faint applause from their friends and marks of derision from the male medical students. Subsequently, each member of that pioneer class won a position in the profession and in the scientific world. She was an aunt of Lucretia Longshore Blankenburg, whose mother, Dr. Hannah Longshore (Mrs. Thomas Ellwood Longshore), was graduated in the same class with Anna.

Career
She was without means at her graduation, yet she soon established a lucrative practice in Philadelphia. Her health became somewhat impaired, and she moved to Langhorne, in 1857, where she married Lambert Hibbs Potts (b. 1831), one of the merchants there. They had a son, Emerson.

A few years later, Dr. Longshore, now Dr. Longshore-Potts, moved to Adrian, Michigan, where she quickly rose to a high position in her profession. She became imbued with the belief that a physician's most sacred duty is to prevent rather than cure disease, and to that end, she gave many private lectures to her patients. The ability of those talks led to her giving a course of public lectures, the meeting being called by the mayor, leading physicians and clergymen. That was in 1876. Her addresses were so favorably received that she concluded to devote all her time to them. She commenced first in small towns, with a boy as agent, who engaged churches and wrote with crayon in blank spaces the place and time of the meetings. Her success was continuous and, as she traveled out into larger towns, became almost phenomenal. The first city of any consequence which she visited as a lecturer was San Francisco, where she appeared in 1881. She then visited the principal coast towns, north as far as Seattle, Washington and south to San Diego, California. 

In May, 1883, she sailed with her party, then consisting of seven, for New Zealand, where, from Auckland to Invercargill, the largest houses were packed to listen to Potts. In November, 1883, she stood before an audience of 4,500 people in the exhibition building, Sydney, New South Wales, where she was introduced by Charles A. Kahlothen, U.S. Consul. The proportions of her enterprise may be judged from the fact that her party had been increased to nine people, and it cost her  to rent the chairs necessary to seat that building for five lectures. She received a greeting there which was repeated in Melbourne, Brisbane, and the larger interior towns of the colonies. 

In November, 1884, she sailed for London, England, where she delivered her first lecture in the large St James's Hall, on February 17, 1885, where Edwin Atkins Merritt, then U.S. Consul-General, presented her to an audience of 3,500 people. Lady Claude Hamilton placed her mansion in Portland Place at Potts' disposal, and between her lectures, which continued for five months, and her receptions in the Hamilton mansion, she stirred London. Every daily paper and all the leading weeklies accorded her praise. She gave one course of lectures for the benefit of the woman's hospital in Soho Square. Many leading charities received substantial aid from her. She spent nearly three years in the U.K., lecturing in all the chief provincial cities and repeating her lectures in London at frequent intervals. 

In October, 1887, she returned to the U.S., making her first appearance in Tremont Temple, Boston. She then appeared in Chickering Hall, in New York City, and from there went to California, lecturing only in the large cities. Just five years from the time she sailed for the Antipodes, she stood before an audience in the Baldwin Theater, San Francisco, that packed that building.

After her return to the U.S., in 1889, she established the Paradise Hotel and Sanitarium in National City, California. She also visited all the large cities in the country. In January, 1890, the close of her lectures in the Grand Opera House, Indianapolis, Indiana, was marked by an unusual scene. The large audience of women rose and greeted her with prolonged cheers, and a committee presented her with an elegant testimonial engrossed on parchment and signed by Caroline Scott Harrison, Eliza Hendricks, May Wright Sewall, Mary Harrison McKee, Governor Alvin Peterson Hovey and many members of the State Senate and House of Representatives, and when she returned there two months later, the common council placed the use of Tomlinson Hall at her disposal without charge.

Potts published three books, Discourses to women on medical subjects (1887), Love, courtship and marriage (1891), and 
The logic of a lifetime (1911). The last of these was a volume of essays self-published at Alameda, California. According to a review in Light (1911):— "It consists of more than 60 brief papers in essay form ranging over many subjects, useful and educative, although at times, a trifle declamatory. Various passages in the book show that the author is in full sympathy with the great harmonising conception of a life beyond, and she writes with conviction of the soul's eventual entrance into another sphere."

Death
Anna Mary Longshore Potts died in San Diego, California, October 24, 1912. At the time of her death, she was believed to have been the last surviving member of the first graduating class of the Women's Medical College of Philadelphia.

Selected works
 Discourses to women on medical subjects, 1887
 Love, courtship and marriage, 1891
 The logic of a lifetime, 1911

References

External links
 

1829 births
1912 deaths
19th-century American physicians
20th-century American physicians
19th-century American women physicians
20th-century American women physicians
Wikipedia articles incorporating text from A Woman of the Century
American medical writers
Women medical writers
Lecturers
People from Langhorne, Pennsylvania
Physicians from Pennsylvania
Woman's Medical College of Pennsylvania alumni
Clubwomen
20th-century American essayists
American women essayists